The Rho Ophiuchi cloud complex is a complex of interstellar clouds with different nebulae, particularly dark nebulae which is centered 1° south of the star ρ Ophiuchi, which it among others extends to, of the constellation Ophiuchus.

Cloud complex
It consists of two major regions of dense gas and dust. The first contains a star-forming cloud (L1688) and two filaments (L1709 and L1755), while the second has a star-forming region (L1689) and a filament (L1712–L1729). These filaments extend up to 10–17.5 parsecs in length and can be as narrow as 0.24 parsecs in width. The large extensions of the complex are also called Dark River clouds (or Rho Ophiuchi Streamers) and are identified as Barnard 44 and 45. Some of the structures within the complex appear to be the result of a shock front passing through the clouds from the direction of the neighboring Sco OB2 association.

Temperatures of the clouds range from 13–22 K, and there is a total of about 3,000 times the mass of the Sun in the material. Over half of the mass of the complex is concentrated around the L1688 cloud, and this is the most active star-forming region. There are embedded infrared sources within the complex. A total of 425 infrared sources have been detected near the L1688 cloud. These are presumed to be young stellar objects, including 16 classified as protostars, 123 T Tauri stars with dense circumstellar disks, and 77 weaker T Tauri stars with thinner disks. The last 2 categories of stars have estimated ages ranging from 100,000 to a million years.

The first brown dwarf to be identified in a star-forming region was Rho Oph J162349.8-242601, located in the Rho Ophiuchi cloud. One of the older objects at the edge of the primary star-forming region was found to be a circumstellar disk seen nearly edge-on. It spans a diameter of 300 AU and contains at least twice the mass of Jupiter. The million-year-old star at the center of the disk has a temperature of 3,000 K and is emitting 0.4 times the luminosity of the Sun.

Gallery

See also
 Orion molecular cloud complex
Taurus molecular cloud
Perseus molecular cloud
Cygnus X
List of nearby stellar associations and moving groups

References

External links

 Astronomy Picture of the Day
 The Colorful Clouds of Rho Ophiuchi 2007 September 3
 Young Stars in the Rho Ophiuchi Cloud 2009 November 13
 Rho Ophiucus Wide Field 2010 May 24
 Colorful Clouds Near Rho Ophiuchi 2012 August 28

Ophiuchus (constellation)
Dark nebulae
Star-forming regions
Molecular clouds